Christiane F. – Wir Kinder vom Bahnhof Zoo is a soundtrack album by David Bowie, released on LP in 1981 through RCA Records (and re-issued on CD through EMI in 2001), for the film about Christiane F. The German title of the film, Wir Kinder vom Bahnhof Zoo, means "We children of Zoo Station", referring to the railway station in Berlin, Germany.

Track listing
All music composed by David Bowie except where noted.

Historical note
Although the entire soundtrack (save for "TVC 15" and "Stay") is made up of songs from Bowie's Berlin years (1977–1979), the story of Christiane F. plays in the early stages of that time (1976–1977); e.g. Christiane F. visited the concert of the Isolar – 1976 Tour in Berlin, which was opened by the song "Station to Station". The live version included in the film and soundtrack is taken from the album Stage, recorded on the 1978 Isolar II Tour.

Charts

Weekly charts

Year-end charts

References

Albums produced by David Bowie
Albums produced by Tony Visconti
David Bowie soundtracks
1981 soundtrack albums
RCA Victor soundtracks
EMI Records soundtracks
Biographical film soundtracks
Drama film soundtracks